Schefflera brenesii is a species of plant in the family Araliaceae. It is found in Costa Rica and Panama. It is threatened by habitat loss.

References

brenesii
Vulnerable plants
Taxonomy articles created by Polbot